The individual show jumping in equestrian at the Rio 2016 Summer Olympics was held from 14–19 August. Like all other equestrian events, the jumping competition was mixed gender, with both male and female athletes competing in the same division. There were 74 competitors from 27 nations. The event was won by Nick Skelton of Great Britain, the nation's first victory in individual jumping and first medal of any color since making the podium four consecutive Games from 1960 to 1972. Silver went to Peder Fredricson of Sweden. Eric Lamaze of Canada took bronze, becoming the first person since 1968 and sixth overall to win multiple medals (adding to his 2008 gold).

The medals were presented by Gerardo Werthein, IOC member, Argentina and Luiz Roberto Giugni, Executive Board Member of the FEI.

Background

This was the 25th appearance of the event, which had first been held at the 1900 Summer Olympics and has been held at every Summer Olympics at which equestrian sports have been featured (that is, excluding 1896, 1904, and 1908). It is the oldest event on the current programme, the only one that was held in 1900.

Three of the top 11 riders (including ties for 9th place) from the 2012 Games returned: gold medalist Steve Guerdat of Switzerland, fifth-place finisher Nick Skelton of Great Britain, and ninth-place finisher Ben Maher of Great Britain. Also returning was 2008 gold medalist Eric Lamaze of Canada, who reached the first round of the final in 2012. Ludger Beerbaum of Germany, the 1992 gold medalist, was back for his seventh Games after missing 2012. The reigning World Champion was Jeroen Dubbeldam of the Netherlands.

Chinese Taipei, Morocco, Peru, and Qatar each made their debut in the event. France and the United States both competed for the 22nd time, tied for most of any nation.

Qualification

Each National Olympic Committee (NOC) could qualify up to 4 horse and rider pairs; there were a total of 75 quota places. Each of the 15 nations qualified for the team jumping could enter 4 pairs in the individual event. The qualified teams were:

 Host Brazil
 5 teams from the World Equestrian Games: the Netherlands, France, the United States, Germany, and Sweden
 3 teams from the European Jumping Championship: Switzerland, Great Britain, and Spain
 2 teams from the Pan American Games: Canada and Argentina
 1 team from the Group C qualification event: Ukraine
 1 team from the Group F qualification event: Qatar
 2 teams from the Group G qualification event: Japan and Australia

There were also 15 individual qualification places, with NOCs not earning team spots able to earn up to 2 individual spots. Most were assigned through regional groups, though some places were open to all competitors:
 Group A had one spot, assigned through rankings
 Group B had one spot, assigned through rankings
 Group C had one spot, assigned through rankings
 Groups D and E had six spots, assigned through the Pan American Games
 Group F had one spot, assigned through rankings
 Group G had one spot, assigned through a qualification event
 The remaining four spots were assigned to the top four remaining ranked riders, regardless of regional group

Competition format

The competition used the five-round, two-stage format introduced in 1992. The first three rounds made up the qualifications, with cuts between each round. The top 60 advanced to the second round; the top 45 advanced to the third round. The second and third rounds were also used for the team jumping event. Following the qualifications, the top 35 pairs moved on to the final round. Only the top 20 pairs advanced to the second of the two final rounds. Final rankings were based on the sum of scores from both rounds of the final stage. A jump-off would be held to break a tie for any of the medal positions.

Schedule
All times are UTC−03:00

Results

Qualifying round

Round 1

The first qualifying round was run on a course with an allowed time of 82 seconds.

Round 2

The second qualifying round took place on 16 August and had an allowed time of 81 seconds.

Round 3

The third qualifying round was run on 17 August on an allowed time of 82 seconds.

A maximum of three riders from a single country could advance to the individual final. Therefore, Ludger Beerbaum did not advance as Germany had three riders with fewer penalty points. The four riders from Switzerland had 9 penalty points each. The Swiss team leader decided not to send Janika Sprunger to the final.

Final

Round A

Round B

Jump-off

References

Individual jumping